John Cramsie (1 February 1832 – 18 February 1910) was an Irish-born Australian politician.

He was born in Balymoney in County Antrim to William Cramsie and Ann Boyd. He migrated to Victoria in 1855, and in 1863 married Lillias Rankin, with whom he had ten children. Before entering politics he was a stock agent in Balranald, New South Wales. In 1880 he was elected to the New South Wales Legislative Assembly for Balranald, serving until his retirement in 1887. Cramsie died at Randwick in 1910.

References

 

1832 births
1910 deaths
Members of the New South Wales Legislative Assembly